Réfléchi was a 64-gun Solitaire-class ship of the line of the French Navy.

Career 
In 1779, Réfléchi was under Captain  Cillart de Suville and part of the White squadron (centre) of the fleet under Orvilliers.

Réfléchi took part in the Battle of Martinique on 18 December 1779, when she, along with Annibal and Vengeur, saved a convoy from the British off Fort Royal. She was part of the French squadron at the action of 20 March 1780 when she fought Parker's squadron off Saint Domingue, along with Diadème, Amphion and Annibal, and was present at the Battle of the Chesapeake.

From 20 August 1783 to 28 December, she was at the Martinique station under Captain Du Bois.

She became a hulk in Brest in November 1788, and was broken up around 1793 after having been renamed Turot.

Sources and references 
 Notes

Citations

Bibliography
 

Ships of the line of the French Navy
1776 ships
Solitaire-class ships of the line